The 2015 Argentine Primera B Nacional season was the 30th season of Argentine second division, with a total of 22 competing teams. It began 14 February and ended 14 November 2015. Although there was some use of a different name earlier in the year, the AFA has consistently used the Primera B Nacional moniker in releases of late.

Competition format
The league's format has changed from last season. This year there will be twenty-two teams which will play each other twice for a total of forty-two matches.

In November 2014, the AFA announced two teams from this season will be promoted to the Primera División. It was later reported that the champion will be promoted directly and positions 2-5 will compete in the "Torneo Reducido" for the second place after the regular season. At the end of the season, four teams will be relegated.

Club information

League table

Results

Torneo Reducido
At the end of the regular season, the four teams placed 2-5 will advance to compete for one place next season in the 2016 Primera División. If a team finishes in 2-5 place but will be relegated, the next highest placed team will advance to the playoff. Teams will play each other over two legs in each round. Matches were played between 19 November – 5 December.

Semifinals

Finals

Relegation
The bottom four teams of this table face relegation. Clubs with an indirect affiliation with Argentine Football Association are relegated to the Torneo Federal A, while clubs directly affiliated face relegation to Primera B Metropolitana.

Source: AFA

Relegation playoff
A single play-off match was played on 25 November 2015 to determine the fourth team to be relegated. Gimnasia y Esgrima de Mendoza lost the play-off match on penalties and were relegated.

See also
 2015 Argentine Primera División
 2014–15 Copa Argentina

References

External links
 Primera B Nacional at soccerway.com

Primera B Nacional seasons
2
Arg